Elections to the Fourth Odisha Legislative Assembly were held 1967.

Constituencies
The elections were held for 140 constituencies, of which 22 were reserved for Scheduled Castes, 34 for Scheduled Tribes and 84 unreserved.

Contesting parties
There are seven national parties Communist Party of India, Congress, Praja Socialist Party, Bharatiya Jan Sangh, Communist Party of India (Marxist), Swatantra Party and Sanghata Socialist Party one registered unrecognised party JAC and some Independent Politiciantook part in this assembly election. Swatantra Party emerged as the winner by winning 49 seats  It is first time in India that Indian National Congress lost the election in a close fight with Swatantra Party  in the state. Rajendra Narayan Singh Deo become Chief Minister by forming a coalition government with JAC. Rajendra Narayan Singh Deo is the Chief Minister of Odisha until President's Rule was imposed in the state for the last few months of the fourth Assembly term.

Results

!colspan=10|
|- style="background-color:#E9E9E9; text-align:center;"
!colspan=2| Party !! Flag !! Seats  Contested !! Won !! Net Change  in seats !! % of  Seats
! Votes !! Vote % !! Change in vote %
|- style="background: #90EE90;"
| 
| style="text-align:left;" |Indian National Congress
| 
| 140 || 31 ||  51 || 22.14 || 12,35,149 || 30.66 ||  12.62
|-
|
| style="text-align:left;" |Bharatiya Jana Sangh
|
| 19 || 0 || "New" || 0 || 21,788 || 4.07 || "New"
|-
| 
| style="text-align:left;" |Praja Socialist Party
|
| 33 || 21 ||  11 || 7.85 || 4,93,750 || 41.16 ||  10.73
|-
| 
| style="text-align:left;" |Communist Party of India
| 
| 31 || 7 ||  3 || 5 || 2,11,999 || 20.71 ||  6.61
|-
| 
| style="text-align:left;" |Communist Party of India (Marxist)
| 
| 10 || 1 || "New" || 0.71 || 46,597 || 18.16 || "New"
|-
| 
| style="text-align:left;" |Swatantra Party
| 
| 101 || 49 || "New" || 35 || 9,09,421 || 34.78 || "New"
|-
| 
| 
| 47 || 26 || "New" || 18.57 || 5,42,734 || 37.17 || "New"
|-
| 
|
| 9 || 2 || N/A || 1.52 || 61,426 || 25.75 || N/A
|-
| 
|
| 140 || 3 || N/A || 1.42 || 5,05,394 || 17.72 || N/A
|- class="unsortable" style="background-color:#E9E9E9"
! colspan = 3|
! style="text-align:center;" |Total Seats !! 140 ( 0) !! style="text-align:center;" |Voters !! 98,73,057 !! style="text-align:center;" |Turnout !! colspan = 2|43,48,838 (44.05%)
|}

Elected members

References

Odisha Legislative Assembly
State Assembly elections in Odisha
Odisha